Andrey Polyanitsa is a retired Ukrainian professional footballer who played as a defender.

Playing career
Andrey Polyanitsa, started his career in 1999 with Desna Chernihiv, where he played 67 matches and scored three goals. In 2002, he moved to Lukor Kalush, before moving to Spartak Ivano-Frankivsk the following season. In 2005 he moved to Stal Kamianske for two seasons, where he played 14 matches. In 2006 he moved to Krymteplytsia Molodizhne in Crimea, playing 34 matches over two seasons. In 2008 he played 11 matches and scored 1 goal for Feniks-Illichovets Kalinine and 9 matches with Naftovyk Okhtyrka. In summer 2010 he moved to Vorskla Poltava where he played 10 matches and scored 1 goal. In January 2011, he moved to Desna Chernihiv where he played 7 matches. The following summer, he moved to Shakhtar Sverdlovsk, playing 22 matches and scoring 1 goal before moving to Poltava-2-Karlivka for the 2012–13 season. In 2013 he moved back to Shakhtar Sverdlovsk, where he played 23 matches and scored 2 goals. In 2014 he played 3 matches for Polesie Dobryanka youth side after which he moved to Avanhard Koryukivka, where he played 70 matches and scored 3 goals.

Coaching career
In August 2022 he was appointed assistant coach of FC Chernihiv.

References

External links 
 Oleksandr Lepekho at footballfacts.ru

1982 births
Living people
Footballers from Chernihiv 
FC Desna Chernihiv players
FC Kalush players
FC Spartak Ivano-Frankivsk players
FC Metalurh Zaporizhzhia players
FC Metalurh-2 Zaporizhzhia players
FC Stal Kamianske players
FC Krymteplytsia Molodizhne players
FC Shakhtar Sverdlovsk players
FC Feniks-Illichovets Kalinine players
FC Naftovyk-Ukrnafta Okhtyrka players
FC Vorskla-2 Poltava players
FC Avanhard Koriukivka players
SDYuShOR Desna players
Ukrainian footballers
Ukrainian Premier League players
Ukrainian First League players
Ukrainian Second League players
Association football defenders
SDYuShOR Desna managers